The Norman Thomas High School for Business and Commercial Education was a public high school (closed in June 2014) in the Murray Hill neighborhood of Manhattan, New York City under the New York City Department of Education. Formerly known as Central Commercial High School (CCHS), and before that, the Central School of Business and Arts, its former location was on 42nd Street in a structure constructed with a 20-story office building in the air rights above it. It was renamed after Presbyterian minister and Socialist activist Norman Thomas and moved to occupy the first nine floors of 3 Park Avenue, a 42-story skyscraper on East 33rd Street at Park Avenue in 1975.

The high school was originally designed to train students for secretarial and commercial occupations such as accounting, bookkeeping, merchandising and salesmanship, clerical skills, stenography and typing. As of 1940, every senior at Central Commercial High School was required to complete four weeks of work in an office during the last semester. In later years, this expanded to include such topics as data processing and physical distribution

Notable alumni

 Barbara Alston, (1943–2018), a lead singer for the girl group the Crystals attended briefly before transferring to William H. Maxwell Vocational School.
 Kool Moe Dee, (b 1962) American rapper, writer and actor, considered one of the forerunners of the new jack swing sound in hip hop
 Luis Flores, (b 1981) Dominican professional basketball player and is top scorer in the Israel Basketball Premier League
 Aurelia Greene, (1934–2021) represented District 77 in the New York State Assembly,
 Special K, (b 1963) American old-school hip hop emcee from the Bronx.
 John Kerwin, talk show host
 Armelia McQueen, (1952–2020) American actress best known for her roles in the Broadway musical Ain't Misbehavin and the film Ghost (1990)
 Louise Meriwether, (b 1923) American novelist, essayist, journalist and activist
 Tito Puente, (1923–2000) Latin jazz and salsa musician and composer
 Khadimou Rassoul Cheikh Fall', better known as Sheck Wes, American rapper, singer, songwriter, model, and professional basketball player for Paris Basketball.

References

External links 

Public high schools in Manhattan
Park Avenue
Kips Bay, Manhattan